Cylindrocopturus is a genus of weevil in the tribe Zygopini. It was initially described by Heller in 1895. Although included in the Lechriopini by some early sources, it has been included in the Zygopini in all more recent works. Species in Cylindrocopturus have an unmodified mesoventrite and do not have sclerolepidia. Two Cylindrocopturus species, C. eatoni and C. furnissi, are considered pests.

Species 
Known species of Cylindrocopturus are as follows:

 Cylindrocopturus adspersus
 Cylindrocopturus binotatus
 Cylindrocopturus centropictus
 Cylindrocopturus crassus
 Cylindrocopturus cretaceus
 Cylindrocopturus dehiscens
 Cylindrocopturus deleoni 
 Cylindrocopturus eatoni
 Cylindrocopturus filicornis
 Cylindrocopturus floridanus
 Cylindrocopturus furnissi 
 Cylindrocopturus helianthus
 Cylindrocopturus hemizoniae 
 Cylindrocopturus horridus 
 Cylindrocopturus jatrophae 
 Cylindrocopturus littoralis 
 Cylindrocopturus longulus 
 Cylindrocopturus lunatus
 Cylindrocopturus mammillatus
 Cylindrocopturus medicatus
 Cylindrocopturus mediinotus
 Cylindrocopturus munitus 
 Cylindrocopturus nanulus
 Cylindrocopturus operculatus 
 Cylindrocopturus princeps 
 Cylindrocopturus quercus 
 Cylindrocopturus sinuatus
 Cylindrocopturus sparsus
 Cylindrocopturus unicolor
 Cylindrocopturus vanduzeei

References 

Baridinae genera